La Musica International Chamber Music Festival is a chamber music festival located in Sarasota, Florida, United States. Concerts are performed annually in the month of April at the Sarasota Opera House. 

Founded in 1987 by Artistic Director Bruno Giuranna (violist), Associate Artistic Director Derek Han (pianist), and Sarasota developer and patron of the arts Piero Rivolta, La Musica has established itself as an artistic and critical success and an outstanding American cultural institution. Its mission is to bring together the finest musicians from around the world to present exciting programs of familiar and seldom-heard chamber music, communicating a joy in performance to enthusiastic audiences. 

In 1992, La Musica moved from performing its concerts in the Historic Asolo Theater to the Sarasota Opera House. Also that year, La Musica was invited to the University of South Florida/New College for rehearsals and lectures, where it remains in residence in Mildred Sainer Pavilion, New College of Florida. Starting in 1994, new festival activities were added: special rehearsals for students, pre-concert lectures, colloquia, and lectures by visiting scholars.

Throughout its history, La Musica has collaborated with other cultural organizations, both national (Chamber Music Society of Lincoln Center) and local (Sarasota Film Society, Sarasota Ballet, Ringling College of Art and Design, GuitarSarasota). New works have been commissioned and or premiered (Turchi, Wallach, Bracali, Wyner, Hyman, Winn, Tower, Bilik). Since 1998, La Musica has embarked on a thematic excursion, exploring ways in which music relates to other art forms and cultural movements.

There'll be no festival in 2020 as the COVID-19 pandemic caused its cancellation.

External links
Official website of La Musica

Annual events in Florida
Chamber music festivals
Classical music festivals in the United States
Culture of Sarasota, Florida
Music festivals in Florida
Music festivals established in 1987
1987 establishments in Florida